Edith Woodman Burroughs (1871 in Riverdale-on-Hudson, New York – 1916 in Flushing, Queens) was an American sculptor. Her work was included in the 1913 Armory Show.

Biography
Born in Riverdale, New York, Woodman began studying with master artists art at the early age of 15, working with Kenyon Cox and Augustus Saint Gaudens at the Art Students League.  By the age of 18 she was supporting herself by designing objects for churches as well as for the Tiffany and Company.

In 1893 she married artist Bryson Burroughs, the future curator of paintings at the Metropolitan Museum of Art in New York City.  She spent the next two years in Paris where she studied with Jean-Antoine Injalbert and Luc-Olivier Merson.  In 1907 she won the Shaw Memorial Prize front the National Academy of Design for a work Circe that was subsequently shown at a major exhibit in Baltimore.

In 1909 she returned to Paris where she "came under the influence of Maillol", after which her work reflected his simpler means of expression.

Woodman Burroughs designed two fountains for the 1915 Panama–Pacific International Exposition in San Francisco. Her Fountain of Youth figure, showing the sweet tenderness, a maidenly loveliness won a silver medal at the Expo.

Burroughs exhibited a bronze bust, Portrait of John Bigelow at the 1913 Armory Show in New York. In 1913, she was elected into the National Academy of Design as an Associate member.

Burroughs has four pieces in the Metropolitan Museum of Art collection from her early 20th century work: her 1908 John La Farge, 1909 Grolier Club Memorial of Edgar Allan Poe, 1911 Roger Fry, which was attributed by the Metropolitan for showcasing her skills in expressive surface modeling, as well as her 1912 At the Threshold.

She died in Flushing, New York on January 6, 1916.

Her work
Her work can be found in numerous museums and galleries including:
 Oakland Museum, Oakland, California
 R.W. Norton Art Gallery, Shreveport, Louisiana
 Newark Museum,  Newark, New Jersey
 Metropolitan Museum of Art, New York City
 Brookgreen Gardens, Murrells Inlet, South Carolina
 Corcoran Gallery of Art, Washington, D.C.
 Yale University, New Haven, Connecticut
 Hearst San Simeon State Historical Monument, San Simeon, California
 Rhode Island School of Design, Providence, Rhode Island

See also
 List of artists in the Armory Show

References

American women sculptors
1916 deaths
1871 births
20th-century American sculptors
20th-century American women artists
19th-century American sculptors
National Academy of Design associates
People from Riverdale, Bronx
Artists from New York City
19th-century American women artists
Sculptors from New York (state)